= Hulikavi =

Coordinates: 15°43′26″N 74°36′07″E

- Village
- Interactive map of Hulikavi
- Country: India
- State: Karnataka
- District: Belgaum
- Talukas: Belgaum

Languages
  - Official: Kannada
- Time zone: UTC+5:30 (IST)

Hulikavi is a village in Belgaum district in the southern state of Karnataka, India.
